Club Atlético Gimnasia y Esgrima (usually known as Gimnasia y Esgrima de Mendoza) is an Argentine football club located in the city of Mendoza. They currently plays in the Primera B Nacional, the second division of the Argentine football league system.

History

The club was founded in 1890 as "Club de Esgrima" (Fencing Club) with Dr. Carlos Ponce as its first president. In 1893 a group of members came up with new ideas, proposing to encourage the practice of other sports, mainly basque pelota. Therefore, the club was renamed "Club de Pelota". In 1894 the club leaders acquired a land in Mendoza.

In 1902, several departments were created, including the football section. For that purpose the club asked the Government of Mendoza a land in Parque General San Martín, which gave 5 hectares. That same year the club changed its name to "Club Social de Gimnasia y Esgrima", creating two divisions: one of them taking over sports such as gymnastics, martial arts, fencing among others. The other division focused on football only.

In 1910 the club toured outside the Province for the first time, playing a match against Club Atlético Sanjuanino in San Juan province. Gimnasia y Esgrima won the match by 2–0.

On July 13, 1913, the team played its first Mendocino derby facing Independiente Rivadavia.

In 1917 Gimnasia y Esgrima played other friendly matches in Córdoba Province previously to arrive to Buenos Aires in 1921, when played Huracán and Boca Juniors. In 1922 Gimnasia was the first team to win the Mendoza Regional league tournament. One year later, Gimnasia y Esgrima crowned champion again, being the first club of Mendoza to win two consecutive championships. The squad won a playoff game against Independiente Rivadavia after both teams finished in the first place at the end of the season.

The squad would win the league again in 1931 and 1933. One year later, the Lobo inaugurated the first stadium in Mendoza Province, playing a friendly match against Gimnasia y Esgrima de Santa Fe. The match finished in a 2–2 draw. Gimnasia y Esgrima won new regional titles in 1937 and 1939.

Titles

National
 Torneo Federal A (1): 2014
 Torneo Regional (9): 1970, 1971, 1972, 1975, 1978, 1981, 1982, 1983, 1984 
 Torneo Argentino B (2): 2005–06, 2013–14

Regional
 Liga Mendocina de Fútbol:
 First Division (20): 1922, 1923, 1931, 1933, 1937, 1939, 1949, 1952, 1964, 1969, 1974, 1977, 1980, 1981, 1982, 1983, 1986, 1991, 1997–98, 2001 
 Second Division (2): 2010, 2012
 Copa Competencia (3): 1923, 1933, 1938

References

External links

 
 Lobo Mendocino
 Aguante El Lobo

 
Football clubs in Mendoza Province
Association football clubs established in 1908
Sport in Mendoza, Argentina
1908 establishments in Argentina